FrontPage Magazine, also known as FrontPageMag.com, is an American political website edited by David Horowitz and published by the David Horowitz Freedom Center. It has been described by scholars and writers as right-wing, far-right, and Islamophobic.

History
FrontPage Magazine is a conservative journal of news and political commentary originally published under the auspices of the Center for the Study of Popular Culture, later called the David Horowitz Freedom Center.

Contributors have included David Horowitz (editor in chief), Paul Gottfried, John Derbyshire, Ann Coulter, Mustafa Akyol, Jamie Glazov, Robert Spencer, Bruce Thornton, Raymond Ibrahim, Kenneth Timmerman, and Stephen Miller.

Content 

FrontPage Magazine has published commentary advancing the Eurabia conspiracy theory, and has been described as part of the counter-jihad movement. The website is edited by Jamie Glazov, considered a "key figure in the transnational counterjihad movement", who also hosts the online TV show The Glazov Gang which "regularly broadcasts interviews with key counterjihad figures".

The website has been described by scholars and writers as right-wing, far-right, Islamophobic, and anti-Islam.

References

Magazines established in 1988
Internet properties established in 2005
American political websites
American conservative websites
David Horowitz
American news websites
Political organizations based in the United States
Conservative magazines published in the United States
Magazines published in Los Angeles
Online magazines published in the United States
Islamophobic publications
Conspiracist media
Counter-jihad